"If You Come to Me" is a song by British girl group Atomic Kitten. It was written by Julian Gallagher, Martin Harrington, Ash Howes, Sharon Murphy, and Richard "Biff" Stannard for their third studio album, Ladies Night (2003). Production was helmed by Gallagher and Stannard, with Harrington and Howes credited as additional producers. Recording of "If You Come to Me" took place at Stannard's recording studio, Biffco, in Dublin, Ireland. A romantic, soulful uptempo ballad, which the band labeled "classic Atomic Kitten", it talks about a woman's desire to be with her partner.

The song was released as the lead single from Ladies Night on 27 October 2003 in the United Kingdom where it peaked at number three on the UK Singles Chart, becoming the group's fifth consecutive top-five hit. Elsewhere, "If You Come to Me" entered the top five in Hungary, Scotland and on a composite Eurochart Hot 100, and reached the top ten in Austria, Ireland, Germany, New Zealand, Poland, and Switzerland. A CGI-heavy music video, directed by duo Adam Townley and Simon Atkinson, was filmed at the Asylum Studios in North London in early October 2003.

Background
"If You Come to Me" was written by British songwriters and record producers Julian Gallagher and Richard "Biff" Stannard along with Martin Harrington, Ash Howes, and Sharon Murphy. Specially written with Atomic Kitten in their minds, it was suggested for recording after Gallagher and Stannard had spoken to the band's record company managing director. Band member Liz McClarnon elaborated in a 2003 interview with BBC Newsround: "[They] said 'We think we've got a really good Kitten song here'. We then heard it and we thought 'Oh my God definitely!' When we recorded it we loved it [...] We wanted people to know that we weren't going to change our sound like a lot of people do. We wanted to keep with what everybody liked about Atomic Kitten." Recording took place at Stannard's recording studio, Biffco, in Dublin, Ireland, with Gallagher and Stannard also overseeing production.

Chart performance
Atomic Kitten's twelfth single overall, "If You Come to Me" was released as the lead single from Ladies Night on 27 October 2003 in the United Kingdom. It debuted and peaked at number three on the UK Singles Chart, becoming the group's fifth consecutive, yet final, top-five hit. The Official Charts Company placed the song 94th on its 2003 year-end singles chart. In 2021, the organisation ranked "If You Come to Me" as Atomic Kitten's eight biggest-selling single in the United Kingdom. Elsewhere in Europe, the song reached the top five in Hungary, Scotland and on a composite Eurochart Hot 100, while reaching the top ten in Austria, Ireland, Germany, Poland and Switzerland. It was the group's last charting single in New Zealand, where it rose to number nine, and their penultimate hit in Australia, where it peaked at number 30.

Music video
A music video for "If You Come to Me" was directed by Adam Townley and Simon Atkinson under their moniker Si & AD and filmed over two days at the Asylum Studios in Perivale, London Borough of Ealing in early October 2003. Largely shot in front of a greenscreen, it has no narrative but instead features on beauty shots and dance routines, intertwined by several costume and make up changes. The video opens with Atomic Kitten near a curtain behind a plain white background. Group members Natasha Hamilton, Jenny Frost, and Liz McClarnon dance behind a plain white background with coloured line patterns coming through, and behind a black background. In the second verse, the band's bodies change colour with butterflies in the sky on them, and it is also shown in the final chorus. During the bridge section of the song, the three girls dance in the rain behind a plain black background.

Track listings

{{tracklist
| headline        = UK CD2 and Australian CD single| extra_column    = Producer(s)

| title1          = If You Come to Me
| writer1         = 
| extra1          = 
| length1         = 3:44

| title2          = So Right
| writer2         = 
| extra2          = 
| length2         = 3:32

| title3          = Feels So Good
| writer3         = 
| extra3          = 
| length3         = 3:33
}}Notes denotes additional producer
"Album Medley" is composed of "Be with You", "Don't Go Breaking My Heart", "Loving You", 	"Believer" and "I Won't Be There."

Credits and personnel
Credits adapted from the liner notes of Ladies Night.Studio Recorded at Biffco Studios (Dublin, Ireland)Personnel'''

 Atomic Kitten – vocals
 Julian Gallagher – writing, production
 Martin Harrington – writing, additional production
 Ash Howes – writing, additional production

 Sharon Murphy – writing
 Richard "Biff" Stannard – writing, production
 Alvin Sweeney – recording, engineering
 Keith Uddin – additional production and mix engineering

Charts

Weekly charts

Year-end charts

Release history

References

2003 singles
Atomic Kitten songs
Innocent Records singles
Songs written by Ash Howes
Songs written by Julian Gallagher
Songs written by Martin Harrington
Songs written by Richard Stannard (songwriter)
Virgin Records singles